Arroio dos Ratos is a municipality in the Brazilian state of Rio Grande do Sul. Thanks to its soil, is nationally known as the National Cradle of the Coal industry. The city is also known as the National Capital  of the Watermelon.

See also
List of municipalities in Rio Grande do Sul

References

Municipalities in Rio Grande do Sul